The James A. Rice House is a historic house at 204 Southeast Third Street in Bentonville, Arkansas.  It is a -story brick structure, with tall arched windows and a bracketed cornice typical of the Italianate style.  It has a two-story porch, asymmetrical massing, and a steeply pitched roof with cut-shingle gable finish typical of the Queen Anne style, which was in fashion when it was built c. 1879.  Its builder and first owner was James A. Rice, a local lawyer who served two terms as mayor.

The house was listed on the National Register of Historic Places in 1984.

See also
National Register of Historic Places listings in Benton County, Arkansas

References

Houses on the National Register of Historic Places in Arkansas
Italianate architecture in Arkansas
Houses completed in 1879
Houses in Bentonville, Arkansas
National Register of Historic Places in Bentonville, Arkansas
1879 establishments in Arkansas
Individually listed contributing properties to historic districts on the National Register in Arkansas